Paremhat 4 - Coptic Calendar - Paremhat 6

The fifth day of the Coptic month of Paremhat, the seventh month of the Coptic year. In common years, this day corresponds to March 1, of the Julian Calendar, and March 14, of the Gregorian Calendar. This day falls in the Coptic Season of Shemu, the season of the Harvest.

Commemorations

Martyrs 

 The martyrdom of Saint Eudoxia 
 The martyrdom of Saint Peter the Priest

Saints 

 The departure of Saint Serapamon, the Hegumen of Saint John's Monastery

References 

Days of the Coptic calendar